Dicaelus purpuratus is a species of ground beetle in the family Carabidae. It is found in North America.

Subspecies
These two subspecies belong to the species Dicaelus purpuratus:
 Dicaelus purpuratus purpuratus Bonelli, 1813
 Dicaelus purpuratus splendidus Say, 1823

References

Further reading

 

Harpalinae
Articles created by Qbugbot
Beetles described in 1813